Vedeno Reserve is a reserve in Chechnya. It adjoins the Shatoi Reserve.

References

Protected areas of Russia
Geography of Chechnya